Saša Bjelanović (born 11 June 1979) is a Croatian retired footballer who played as a striker.

He has held an Italian passport since 2007, as his grandmother was from Trieste, Venezia Giulia; this made him eligible to acquire Italian nationality at birth.

Club career
Saša Bjelanović started his career at Zadar. At the age of 20, he had already made 76 appearances for his native club. In summer 1999, he was signed by Croatian giant Dinamo Zagreb. However, he made only one appearance before being transferred to NK Istra from Pula and then NK Varteks.

On 31 May 2002, Como, at that time in Serie A, brought Bjelanović to Italy. He played 15 Serie A games for Como, and left on loan to Chievo.

As Como was relegated in summer 2003, on 16 July 2003, Bjelanović was loaned to Perugia. But on 30 August 2003, he was sold to Genoa C.F.C. of Serie B on a co-ownership deal for €1 million. Genoa was owned by former Como owner Enrico Preziosi.

Bjelanović played 41 out of possible 46 games for Genoa, and as Como was relegated again, this time to Serie C1, Genoa bought all the registration rights at the end of the season for another €150,000.

Genoa did not win promotion in summer 2004 and Bjelanović played his second Serie A season for U.S. Lecce on loan.

In summer 2005, Genoa finally won promotion to Serie A, but due to match fixing scandal, Genoa was relegated to play in the Serie C1 next season. As a result, Bjelanović was sold to Ascoli, the team which was promoted in Genoa's place, on a co-ownership deal.

Bjelanović scored four goals in 31 Serie A appearances for Ascoli in the 2005–06 season. He then went on to score seven goals in the 2006–07 season and became the top scorer for Ascoli for the season. This is due to players leaving the club and Ascoli relegated to Serie B after finishing at 19th.

Bjelanović signed for his 6th Italian club, Torino F.C., along with Paolo Zanetti, on 21 June 2007, on a co-ownership deal. In June 2008 Torino full contracted with Bjelanović.

In August 2008, Bjelanović was transferred to Vicenza. On 1 July 2009 he joined Vicenza definitely in 3-year contract for €700,000 as part of Nicolás Gorobsov's deal (for €800,000).

In June 2010 he was transferred to Liga I champions CFR Cluj for €250,000.. He played only six months in Romania, in January 2011 being sold back in Italy, to Serie B club Atalanta for €385,000. However he was transferred to Serie B club Hellas Verona F.C. for free from the 2011 Serie B champion on 31 August 2011, the last day of Italian transfer window, after a nil game in 2011–12 Serie A. At Verona he re-joined the former Cluj coach, Italian Andrea Mandorlini. On 3 September 2012 the last day of Romanian transfer window, he returned to Cluj for undisclosed fee.

He then joined Lega Pro club Messina for the 2014–15 season, but left the club in December 2014 by mutual consent, successively signing for Pordenone, another Lega Pro club, five days later.

International career
Bjelanović was a member of the Croatian Youth team at the 1999 FIFA World Youth Championship, where he made only one appearance and scored one goal.

He made his debut for the Croatian senior national team on 9 February 2005, coming on as a second-half substitute for Eduardo da Silva in a friendly match against Israel, which ended in a 3–3 draw. In late March 2005, he was also part of the Croatian squad that played Iceland and Malta in the 2006 World Cup qualifying, but remained an unused substitute in both matches.

Post career 
On 25 May 2018 Bjelanović was confirmed as the Director of Football at Hajduk Split. Bjelanović was working as previous director Mario Branco's assistant before being promoted after the departure of the Portuguese.

Honours

Club
Perugia
UEFA Intertoto Cup: 2003

CFR Cluj
 Romanian Supercup: 2010

Atalanta
 Serie B: 2010-11

See also
 Croats of Italy

Notes

References

External links
 
 
 
 
 

1979 births
Living people
Sportspeople from Zadar
Croatian people of Italian descent
Association football forwards
Croatian footballers
Croatia youth international footballers
Croatia international footballers
NK Zadar players
GNK Dinamo Zagreb players
NK Istra players
NK Varaždin players
Como 1907 players
A.C. ChievoVerona players
A.C. Perugia Calcio players
Genoa C.F.C. players
U.S. Lecce players
Ascoli Calcio 1898 F.C. players
Torino F.C. players
L.R. Vicenza players
CFR Cluj players
Atalanta B.C. players
Hellas Verona F.C. players
S.S.D. Varese Calcio players
A.C.R. Messina players
Pordenone Calcio players
Croatian Football League players
Serie A players
Serie B players
Serie C players
Liga I players
Croatian expatriate footballers
Expatriate footballers in Italy
Croatian expatriate sportspeople in Italy
Expatriate footballers in Romania
Croatian expatriate sportspeople in Romania
HNK Hajduk Split non-playing staff